André Sinédo (26 February 1978 – 2 October 2022) was a New Calendonian footballer who played as a defender. He latterly played for AS Magenta in the New Caledonia Division Honneur and the New Caledonia national football team.

References

1978 births
2022 deaths
New Caledonian footballers
New Caledonia international footballers
Association football defenders
2002 OFC Nations Cup players
2008 OFC Nations Cup players
AS Magenta players